Seton Catholic College Preparatory High School is a Catholic high school within the Roman Catholic Archdiocese of Seattle in Vancouver, Washington, United States. The school is named after Elizabeth Ann Seton, the first native-born citizen of the United States to be canonized by the Roman Catholic Church.

History
Seton opened in 2009 with 30 Ninth graders and 11 tenth graders. It is the first Catholic high school in southwest Washington in 43 years. In Seton's second year, they had 84 students in three classes, Freshmen, Sophomore, and Junior. The third year, they had 119, with Freshmen, Sophomores, Juniors, and Seniors attending.

Seton was housed in a leased building, with no gymnasium or athletic fields, until 2016 when it opened a new school building on land it owned.

References

External links
 

High schools in Clark County, Washington
Catholic secondary schools in Washington (state)
Educational institutions established in 2009
2009 establishments in Washington (state)
High schools within the Archdiocese of Seattle
Schools in Vancouver, Washington
High schools in Vancouver, Washington